The 2012 World Junior Speed Skating Championships was held in Obihiro, Japan, from 2–4 March 2012.

Russian skater Pavel Kulizhnikov originally won the gold medal in the 1000 meter race and the bronze medal in the 500 meter race, but was later disqualified from the tournament (along with the Russian boys team pursuit) and suspended for a doping violation.

Medal summary

Medal events

Men

Women

Medal table

External links
Official website
Results

See also 
 Speed skating at the 2012 Winter Youth Olympics

References

World Junior Speed Skating Championships
World Junior Speed Skating Championships
World Junior Speed Skating Championships
International speed skating competitions hosted by Japan
Sport in Hokkaido
2012 in youth sport